Les Jackson may refer to:
 Les Jackson (cricketer) (1921–2007), English cricketer
 Leslie Douglas Jackson (1917–1980), Australian fighter ace
 Les Jackson (ice hockey) (born 1952), Canadian ice hockey player
 R. Leslie Jackson, Chief Justice of the Provincial Court of New Brunswick

See also
 Lesley Jackson, English design curator, historian and author